Sandra Klemenschits and Andreja Klepač were the defending champions, but decided not to participate together. Klemenschits teamed up with Mona Barthel, but lost in the quarterfinals to Paula Ormaechea and Dinah Pfizenmaier. Klepač teamed up with María Teresa Torró Flor, but they lost in the final to Karolína Plíšková and Kristýna Plíšková, 6–4, 3–6, [6–10].

Seeds

Draw

References 
 Draw

Gastein Ladies - Doubles
2014 Doubles
Gast
Gast